David Heidenreich may refer to:

 David Elias Heidenreich (1638–1688), German poet, dramatist, librettist and translator
 David Heidenreich (footballer) (born 2000), Czech footballer